Ilario Spolverini (1657–1734), known as Spolverini, was an Italian painter.

Biography
Spolverini was born in Parma. The influence of Mercanti’s master Francesco Monti, known as Brescianino, is evident in his choice of subjects, including the battles, knights and scenes characterised by movement. After a trip to Venice together with Brescianino, his painting displayed a new approach to colour that made it fully original. His work for various noble families in the area of Parma and Piacenza included a series of paintings celebrating the deeds of the Farnese dynasty commissioned by the family in 1714 and repeated three times for residences in Parma, Piacenza and Colorno.

Spolverini painted battle scenes for the Duke. His religious artwork was placed in the Certosa and the Cathedral of Parma.  Among the pupils were Francesco Simonini, Antonio Fratacci, Clemente Ruta and Giuseppe Peroni. He died in Piacenza.

References
 Domenico Sedini, Ilario Spolverini, online catalogue Artgate by Fondazione Cariplo, 2010, CC BY-SA (source for the first revision of this article).

Other projects

17th-century Italian painters
Italian male painters
18th-century Italian painters
1657 births
1734 deaths
Painters from Parma
Italian Baroque painters
Italian battle painters
18th-century Italian male artists